The 1929 Connecticut Aggies football team was an American football team that represented Connecticut Agricultural College, now the University of Connecticut, in the New England Conference during the 1929 college football season.  The Aggies were led by seventh year head coach Sumner Dole, and completed the season with a record of 4–4. The team played its home games at Gardner Dow Field in Storrs, Connecticut.

Schedule

References

Connecticut
UConn Huskies football seasons
Connecticut Aggies football